The Royal House of LaBeija is a prominent drag family founded by Crystal LaBeija and Lottie LaBeija in 1972. Crystal and Lottie established the House of LaBeija in response to the racially oppressive drag pageant system of 1960s America. Their first event was called "Crystal & Lottie LaBeija presents the first annual House of Labeija Ball at Up the Downstairs Case on West 115th Street & 5th Avenue in Harlem, NY." This is thought to be the birth of house culture within the ballroom scene—as it is known today. Houses serve as alternative families, primarily for gay, gender nonconforming and transgender youth and others who feel ostracized from conventional support systems.

House of LaBeija Film 
On April 19, 2022, the Tribeca Film Festival announced that the House of LaBeija, a short film created by Fredgy Noël, would be featured at the festival. The film pays homage to the Royal House of LaBeija through a series of letters from its members. The film casts Vivian LaBeija, Samil LaBeija, Krystal LaBeija, Jasmine Rice LaBeija, Bougie LaBeija, Jeffrey Bryant, and Diovanna LaBeija.

House mothers and fathers 
Like other drag families, the House of LaBeija is structured like a family, with a house “mother” and “father” who oversee and direct the group.

House Mothers

House Fathers

Notable members

Past events

References 

House of LaBeija